Marcus Annius Verus may refer to: 
 Marcus Annius Verus (grandfather of Marcus Aurelius)
 Marcus Annius Verus (father of Marcus Aurelius)
 Marcus Annius Verus, emperor as Marcus Aurelius
 Marcus Annius Verus Caesar